Qomi Kola (also Romanized as Qomī Kolā and Qomī Kalā) is a village in Esbu Kola Rural District, in the Central District of Babol County, Mazandaran Province, Iran. At the 2006 census, its population was 652, in 181 families.

References 

Populated places in Babol County